Football Queensland North is a Football Queensland licensed zone which operates soccer competitions within the cities and shires of Townsville, Ingham, and Ayr. Junior competitions are regularly only inclusive of Townsville clubs, however Ayr and Ingham run their own junior programs.

Football Queensland North
Football Queensland North is responsible for running the North Queensland Premier League, and all other Junior and Senior competitions in the area. They are also responsible for all refereeing, coaching, and playing programs in the region. Most clubs offer both male and female football. Football Queensland North was formerly known as Townsville Football, and changed for governance purposes in 2018.

North Queensland Premier League
The North Queensland Premier League is contested by the teams following:

The 2020 Premiers Plate was won by Saints Eagles Souths, where they also went and won the grand final 4–2 over Mundingburra Aitkenvale Olympic. In 2021, MA Olympic won the grand final 3-1 over Brothers Townsville FC.

Other clubs from the region that do not participate in the NQ Premier League include Wulguru United, NQ Congo United and Northern Beaches FC. 

In August 2021, it was announced that the NQ Premier League would transition to FQPL North.

Reference List

External links
 
 Football Queensland North Official Website

Football Queensland
North Queensland